Sardar is a 2022 Indian Tamil-language spy action-thriller film written and directed by P. S. Mithran and produced by S. Lakshman Kumar under the banner of Prince Pictures. The film stars Karthi in a dual role alongside Raashii Khanna, Rajisha Vijayan, Chunky Pandey, Laila, Rithvik, Yugi Sethu, Avinash and Balaji Sakthivel in prominent roles. The film music was composed by G. V. Prakash Kumar, with cinematography by George C. Williams, and film editing by Ruben. The film marks Hindi film actor Chunky Panday's debut and Laila's comeback to Tamil cinema.

The film was announced in November 2020, and filming began in April 2021, shootings and production were delayed for 1 year, due to the COVID-19 pandemis. Shoots resumed in January 2022 and wrapped up in June 2022. The filming took place in Chennai, Mumbai, Mysore, Azarbaijan and Georgia, and moved into post-production working in July 2022.

Sardar was released by theatrically on October 21, 2022, prior to the Diwali week, along with Sivakarthikeyan's Prince, and received highly positive reviews from critics and audience. The film's sequel titled Sardar 2 is also in development with the main cast returning.

Plot 
Inspector Vijay Prakash is a publicity-hungry officer, who always live in the media limelight as he wants to undo hurdles in his profession due to the reputation of his absconding father Chandra Bose- a former spy who gets framed as a national traitor. Vijay is raised by his uncle Paavadaisaami, who is also a police officer by profession, as his entire extended family commits suicide out of shame when the news of his father's treason goes public. Vijay tries to woo his lawyer friend Shalini, but she refuses to accept him due to his fame-seeking attitude.

Meanwhile, Vijay is assigned the mission of catching a mastermind, who has stolen a highly classified file in Rajaji Bhavan, which containing background information of agents that have been working in the RAW since the 1980s. Viewing this as a golden opportunity to build his reputation, Vijay starts investigating the case and learns that a social activist named Sameera Thomas has stolen the file. Vijay tries to find Sameera with the help of her son, Timothy "Timmy" but finds that Sameera's corpse has been found and she is declared a national traitor. Taking the case personally, Vijay investigates and learns that Sameera was interrogated about a person named Sardar, but she did not reveal anything. 

Through Sameera's laptop, Vijay finds that Sameera has been protesting against a water packaging company, run by a former NSA officer Maharaj Rathore, whose project One India One Pipeline is expected to unify and control the supply of potable water across India. As per the research information obtained from Sameera's laptop, the company has been producing toxic water as a by-product, which contains carcinogens and other harmful chemicals. As a result of the drinking water, Timmy was diagnosed with sarcoidosis. Later, Vijay and Shalini learn that Sameera was heading to a train station to meet an accomplice. He finds her accomplice at the train station and manages to capture him, but the accomplice gets killed. Amongst his belongings, Vijay checks a book that contains a destination address (which Vijay had previously seen with Timmy as he posted a letter to their relative Victor on the advice of Sameera) at the Chittagong prison in Bangladesh. 

Meanwhile, the RAW agency receives information about Sameera's letter, which is named CODE RED. Rathore contacts the NIA and tries to get the warden to finish off Sardar, but he manages to escape from the prison. Vijay finds a location from the accomplice's belongings, which is a petrol bunk with a secret tunnel. Vijay finds a file after a brawl with an assassin, who also came to retrieve the file. Going through the file, Vijay learns that Sardar is actually Chandra Bose.

Past: In 1985, Sardar is working incognito, as a spy for RAW, by disguising himself as a drama artist and lives happily with his family. Sardar falls in love with Indhra Rani (who also loved him, but later learns about his profession) and they get married, and their son Vijay is born. One day, Sardar receives his next assignment to investigate the India-Pakistan border, where the agency learns about suspicious activities lurking at the border. Being a master-of-disguise, Sardar manages to escape with a photo and a type-written translated copy of a file, written in Chinese. After detailing the file to his superior officers Rathore and Victor, they learn about China's plan to spread false news about poisoning the country's water through Pakistan and implementing pipelines to monopolize India's water supply through One India One Pipeline.

They also learn that a mole, codenamed Laughing Buddha, in their agency, is helping China with the mission. Rathore and Victor sends Sardar to track down Laughing Buddha. Sardar gets in contact with another agent codenamed Cockroach, and deduces that the NSA Chief, P. K. Abraham, is actually Laughing Buddha. They manages to capture him in Bangladesh. However, Rathore gets consumed by greed and decides to eliminate Abraham. Sardar tells Rathore that he will eliminate Abraham, to which he agrees, and Sardar gets imprisoned for 32 years in Bangladesh prison under the account of falsely holding multiple passports, while Rathore falsely frames Sardar as a national traitor and resigns himself from RAW. Afterwards, Rathore secretly joins China and became the head of One India One Pipeline. After learning about Rathore's treachery, Sardar gets enraged, but remembers that he has stored the copies of the file and hidden them in a safe locker. Through Sameera, Sardar decides to finish the mission.

Present: Rathore heads to the RAW's vault and tries to track the person who posted the letter to Sardar, while Vijay learns that Paavaidaisaami is one of Rathore's men, where he is brought to the RAW vault. Under the orders of Chief Chandra Mohan, the RAW agents try to secure Victor and bring him into the headquarters, while Rathore sends his men to kill Victor, but Sardar arrives and kills all of them. Accompanied by Timmy to the headquarters and in the guise of Victor, Sardar and Timmy arrive at the headquarters and defeat the other agents. Inside the vault, RAW agents try to hold back Sardar unsuccessfully. Rathore confronts Sardar and reveals that he had killed the latter's family after he came to know that Rani had eavesdropped on their conversation using the secret frequency of Sardar and Rathore, after killing them all he staged it like a suicide, but left Vijay alive deliberately to make people believe that his family committed suicide out of disgrace and to make him bear his father's disgrace.

Vijay also learns about this and gets enraged. Sardar, along with Timmy escapes in a truck filled with sodium. Rathore learns this and deduces that Sardar is planning to destroy the pipeline, and heads to the water plant, to stop him. Sardar manages to reach and defeat the guards at the water plant. He destroys the pipeline and stops the hazardous water from flowing through villages. Upon finally killing Rathore, Sardar meets Vijay and tells him that he cannot live a peaceful life as he is committed to being a spy for the country and leaves. Sameera is proven innocent, while Sardar heads towards another mission and the Central Government cancels the One India One Pipeline. However, Vijay is suspended from the police force, for his inability in nabbing Sameera and Sardar alive.

In a post-credits scene, Chandra Mohan reveals to Vijay that he was the one who pulled the strings, in his suspension from the police force, and appoints Vijay to work as a spy, for RAW. Vijay is given a mission in Cambodia, with a codename.

Cast 
Karthi in a dual role as:
Agent Chandra Bose alias Sardar, an ex-RAW field operative and Vijay's father
Inspector Vijay Prakash, a publicity-hungry police officer and Sardar's son
Raashii Khanna as Shalini, a lawyer, Vijay's love interest
Rajisha Vijayan as Indhra Rani, Bose's wife and Vijay's mother
Chunky Panday as Maharaj Rathore
Laila as Sameera Thomas, a social activist and Timmy's mother (Voice dubbed by Savitha Reddy)
Rithvik as Timothy alias Timmy, Sameera's son
Munishkanth as Paavadaisami, Vijay's adopted uncle
Sengottuvel as Kathiresan, Vijay's Friend
Ashwin Kumar as Rathore's hitman 
Yugi Sethu as Agent Karapampoochi
Avinash as Victor (Chetta)
Yog Japee as Chandra Mohan, RAW Chief 
Mohammad Ali Baig as P. K. Abraham, NSA Chief
Balaji Sakthivel as Chidambaram, Bose's father, an ex-military officer and Vijay's grandfather
Dinesh Prabhakar as Chittagong Prison guard
 Aadhira Pandilakshmi as Muthulakshmi, Bose's mother and Vijay's grandmother
Sal Yusuf as General Yusuf (Pakistan Army)
Ilavarasu as Politician
 Sahana Vasudevan as RAW officer
 Shyam Krishnan as Rathore's assistant
Swaminathan as Reporter
Irumbu Thirai Sharath Ravi as Goon
Jagan Krishnan as Media Analyst
K. S. Krishnan as Kuppusami, Timmy's doctor
Vijay Varadaraj as Philips
Abdool Lee as Abdul, a Reporter
Myna Nandhini as Valli, playing the role as goddess Valli during a drama act

Production

Development 
In October 2020, sources claimed that Karthi is reported to star in new film helmed by P. S. Mithran,  who directed Vishal's Irumbu Thirai (2018) and Sivakarthikeyan's Hero (2019). The film officially announced on 14 November 2020 (on Diwali), coinciding puja at the Prince Pictures.

Casting 
In April 2021, Raashii Khanna was announced as a lead actress to star opposite Karthi, with Simran being signed to play a social activist role in the film. The makers announced that Chunky Panday was cast as the main antagonist in the film, which marks his debut in Tamil cinema. In May, Rajisha Vijayan was announced as second female lead. In March, Simran opt out the project due to her sitting schedule conflicts. Instead, actress Laila signed the project in same month, marking her returning to cinema industry after 16 years break.

Filming 
Then, the first day shooting was started on 26 April 2021. Due to the second wave of the COVID-19 pandemic, the shooting halted on 29 April 2021 after two day's shoot at Chennai. The shoots resumed on January 9, 2022. The makers constructed a set worth of 2 crores, planning to shoot major portions of the film on the sets in the meantime. Raashii Khanna joins the sets on February 5, 2022. And second schedule begins on March 19, 2022. her portions filmed for 12 days in Chennai , Mumbai and Mysore. Chunky Panday's major portions were filmed in Parliament building, Azarbaijan and Georgia so far the makers spend more 4 crore for the sets.

Music

The music of the film is composed by G. V. Prakash Kumar, replacing Mithran's norm composer Yuvan Shankar Raja and working with Karthi for the third time. The first single of the film titled "Yaerumayileri" sung by Karthi himself was released on 2 October 2022.

Release

Theatrical 
Sardar was released on 21 October 2022 on the eve of Diwali along with Sivakarthikeyan's  Prince, with official announcement made on Karthi's birthday.

Distribution 
Distribution rights of the film for Tamil Nadu region were acquired by Red Giant Movies. The Telugu states distribution rights bagged by Annapurna Studios. The Karnataka region distribution rights were acquired by AV Media Consultancy.

Home media 
The post-theatrical streaming rights of the film were bought by Aha. The satellite rights of the film were sold to Kalaignar TV,  even before the shootings. The film had its digital premiere on the streaming platform from 18 November 2022.

Reception 
Sardar received highly positive reviews from critics.

Kirubhakar Purushothaman of The Indian Express gave 3.5/5 stars and wrote "However, with the speed at which things proceed in the film, you forget and forgive those shortcomings". Tanmayi Sharma of Pinkvilla gave the film's rating 3.5/5 and wrote "On the whole, Sardar is definitely a hit this festive season and something every audience would love to watch on the big screen." Avinash Ramachandran of Cinema Express rated 3.5 out of 5 stars and wrote that "Mithran's propensity for promising us a franchise of sorts is known, and with Sardar, he has definitely delivered a film with the potential to finally fulfill that promise". M. Suganth of The Times of India gave 3/5 rating for this film and wrote "Sardar is a solid spy movie, nothing more nothing less".

Priyanka Sundar of Firstpost rated the film 3 out of 5 and wrote "A spy film has to be stylish, sharp and slick if it is set in the present. Since Sardar is partly set in the 80s, the stunts in the film are more brutal and physically intimate". Srivatsan S of The Hindu wrote that "Karthi is enjoyable in this generic and message-heavy thriller”. Janani K of India Today rated 2.5 out of 5 stars and called it "A solid film with a strong core idea. With a few misses here and there, the film makes for a compelling watch." A critic for Behindwoods rated the film 3 out of 5 stars and wrote that "Karthi proves he's a bankable star at box office with yet another hit-film that will complete your festival celebrations." Sowmya Rajendran of The News Minute rated 1.5/5 stars and wrote that "The film moves across time periods, shifts from one country to another, and never tires of its ambition to drill information into our brains".

Sequel 
The sequel of the film was officially announced by the production house, on the film's success meet, which was held on 27 October 2022. It is tentatively titled as Sardar 2.

References

External links 
 

2020s Tamil-language films
Films scored by G. V. Prakash Kumar
Indian spy action films
Indian action thriller films
Films shot in Chennai
Films shot in Mumbai
Films shot in Azerbaijan
Films shot in Georgia (country)